V. Tejeswini Bai is representative for India in the sport of Kabaddi. She was a member of the kabaddi team that won a gold medal in the 2010 Asian games in Guangzhou.

References

Living people
Indian kabaddi players
Asian Games medalists in kabaddi
Kabaddi players at the 2010 Asian Games
Kabaddi players at the 2014 Asian Games
Year of birth missing (living people)
Asian Games gold medalists for India
Medalists at the 2010 Asian Games
Medalists at the 2014 Asian Games
Place of birth missing (living people)